Hamilton Power Plant may refer to

a power plant in Hamilton, Ohio, USA
a former power plant in Hamilton, South Lanarkshire, Scotland
Hamilton Power Station in Lowell, Massachusetts, USA